Apache National Forest was established by the U.S. Forest Service in Arizona and New Mexico on July 1, 1908, with  from portions of Black Mesa National Forest. In 1974 the entire forest was administratively combined with Sitgreaves National Forest to create Apache-Sitgreaves National Forests. The New Mexico section is now administered by the Gila National Forest. The area of the former Apache National Forest covers most of Greenlee County, Arizona (excepting the southernmost part of the county), southern Apache County, Arizona, and part of western Catron County, New Mexico. The former Apache is much the larger than the former Sitgreaves. There are local ranger district offices in Alpine, Clifton, and Springerville. (Springerville is also the headquarters of the combined Apache–Sitgreaves.)

Wilderness areas
There are four wilderness areas within Apache National Forest that are part of the National Wilderness Preservation System:
 Bear Wallow Wilderness
 Blue Range Primitive Area (bordering the Blue Range Wilderness managed by the Gila NF)
 Escudilla Wilderness
 Mount Baldy Wilderness

References

External links
 Forest History Society
 Listing of the National Forests of the United States and Their Dates (Forest History Society website) Text from Davis, Richard C., ed. Encyclopedia of American Forest and Conservation History. New York: Macmillan Publishing Company for the Forest History Society, 1983. Vol. II, pp. 743–788.

Protected areas of Apache County, Arizona
Protected areas of Catron County, New Mexico
Former National Forests of Arizona
Former National Forests of New Mexico
Protected areas of Greenlee County, Arizona
Apache-Sitgreaves National Forests